John Mág Tighearnán, the Second (anglicised John McKiernan) was chief of the McKiernan Clan of Tullyhunco, County Cavan including the period 1641 to 1657.

Chieftainship
After the Ulster Plantation, The McKiernan castle at Croaghan, now in the townland of Coolnashinny, had been granted to Sir James Craig and John then lived in the townland of Anaigh.

1641 Rebellion
John joined the Irish Rebellion of 1641 against British rule and he led the McKiernan forces in the wars that followed.

County Cavan depositions

The surviving British settlers later made depositions about the rebels activities, some of which mentioned John and the other McKiernans.

Thomas Jones and William Jones of Cornacrum stated:

A note of the names of them which we knowe of our owne knowledge to be pillagers of the brittish in the County of Cauan.. John Kernan of Anaigh

Siege of Croaghan and Keilagh
The castles of Croaghan and Keelagh, Killeshandra belonging to Sir James Craig and Sir Francis Hamilton were besieged by the McKiernans along with their allies, the McGoverns and O'Reillys, when the 1641 rebellion started. The inhabitants held out until 15 June 1642 when they surrendered and went to Drogheda.

John Simpson of Killeshandra also made a deposition about the siege of Keelagh:

When Croaghan and Keelagh surrendered, John McKiernan was one of the signatories to the surrender agreement:

Siege of Clonmel
During the Cromwellian conquest of Ireland, the Clonmel garrison changed as the arrival of the Puritan army through Kilkenny became imminent.  In November 1649, the town's mayor, John Bennet White, wrote to the Duke of Ormond seeking military assistance.  Colonel Oliver Stephenson and part of the old Confederate army, mostly from County Clare, took up quarters.  However these southern Confederates were not fully trusted by the townspeople, particularly after the fall of Carrick on Suir due to treachery.  Ormond arrived in person at the end of the month and the Clare men were replaced by experienced soldiers from Ulster under Hugh Dubh O'Neill, a veteran of siege warfare in the Thirty Years' War.  Under his command were 1,500 soldiers from the Irish Ulster army, mostly from the modern counties of Tyrone and Cavan.  Included in O'Neill's command was a regiment commanded by Colonel Philip O'Reilly.  A muster of these troops took place at Clonmel on 3 January 1650 and one of O'Reilly's companies was led by Captain Cú Connacht Mág Tighearnán. The muster reads-

(16) Captain Coochonaght McKearnan's company, consisting of Captain, Lieutenant, Ensign, one Sargent, one drum, three Corporalls, 13 Musketteers 35 pikemen, and 8 unarmed men, present; 6 sick by certificate, and one Sargent prisoner with the enemy, as the Captain protesteth.

Oliver Cromwell besieged the town in April 1650.  He knew that O'Neill's garrison and supplies were severely depleted and planned to try a fresh assault with close artillery support to batter the town and its defenders.  O'Neill's men were out of ammunition and slipped away under cover of darkness – making their way to Waterford.  Clonmel was then surrendered to Cromwell.

References

17th-century deaths
Irish lords
People from County Cavan
17th-century Irish people
17th-century Roman Catholics